Stacey Kent (born March 27, 1965) is an American jazz singer from South Orange, New Jersey.

Kent was nominated for a Grammy Award and was awarded the Chevalier de l'Ordre des Arts et des Lettres (Order of Arts and Letters) by the French Minister of Culture in 2009. She is married to saxophonist, composer Jim Tomlinson, who produces Kent's albums and writes songs for her with his lyricist partner, novelist Kazuo Ishiguro.

Early life and education 
Stacey Kent was born in South Orange, New Jersey. Her paternal grandfather was Russian and grew up in France. After graduating from Sarah Lawrence College, she traveled to England to study music at the Guildhall School of Music and Drama in London, where she met saxophonist Jim Tomlinson, whom she married on August 9, 1991.

Career
In the 1990s, she began her professional career singing at Café Bohème in London's Soho. After two or three years, she began opening for established acts at Ronnie Scott's Jazz Club in London. In 1995, she appeared in Richard Loncraine's film Richard III (starring Ian McKellen), singing "Come Live with Me and Be My Love" (composed by Trevor Jones) at the Grand Ball celebrating the Yorkist triumph in the Wars of the Roses.  Her first album, Close Your Eyes, was released in 1997.

Novelist Kazuo Ishiguro wrote the liner notes to Kent's 2003 album, In Love Again. Ishiguro met Kent after he chose her recording of "They Can't Take That Away from Me" as one of his Desert Island Discs in 2002. In 2006, Tomlinson and Ishiguro began to write songs for her. Ishiguro has said of his lyric writing that "with an intimate, confiding, first-person song, the meaning must not be self-sufficient on the page. It has to be oblique, sometimes you have to read between the lines" and that this realization has had an "enormous influence" on his fiction writing.

Tomlinson and Ishiguro co-wrote four songs on the album Breakfast on the Morning Tram. The first of their songs, "The Ice Hotel", won first prize in the International Songwriting Competition in April 2008. Kent recorded several more Tomlinson/Ishiguro songs on Dreamer In Concert, The Changing Lights, and I Know I Dream: The Orchestral Sessions.

Tomlinson and Ishiguro have subsequently written songs for three more of her albums (Dreamer, The Changing Lights and I Know I Dream) and continue to write for her today.

Popular success 

Kent's album The Boy Next Door achieved Gold album status in France in September 2006. Breakfast on the Morning Tram (2007) achieved Platinum album status in France in November 2007 and Double Gold status in Germany in February 2008. Raconte-moi... was recorded in French and achieved Gold status in both France and Germany and became the second best selling French language album worldwide in 2010.

Dreamer In Concert (2011) was recorded in May, 2011, at La Cigale in Paris. The album includes three songs previously unrecorded by Kent: "Waters of March" by Antonio Carlos Jobim, "Postcard Lovers" by Jim Tomlinson with lyrics by Kazuo Ishiguro, and "O Comboio" by Portuguese poet António Ladeira.

In 2013, Kent released The Changing Lights, a Brazilian-tinged album, covering bossa nova classics such as Jobim's "How Insensitive" and again collaborating with Tomlinson and Ishiguro. In 2014, she left Warner Bros. and signed with Sony. Sony released Tenderly, an album of standards with Roberto Menescal, one of the founders of bossa nova. She met Menescal in Brazil in 2011 at the 80th birthday celebration of the Christ the Redeemer statue. They discovered they were fans of each other's work and collaborated on an album of standards inspired by Menescal's admiration for the duo of Julie London and Barney Kessel.

In 2014, Marcos Valle invited her to tour in celebration of the fiftieth anniversary of his career. They recorded the album Ao Vivo and a DVD that was recorded live at the Birdland club in New York City and the Blue Note in Tokyo.

In 2017, Kent recorded her next album for Sony, I Know I Dream: The Orchestral Sessions, her first album with an orchestra, comprising 58 musicians with arrangements by Tommy Laurence, with music from the Great American Songbook, French chansons, songs by Edu Lobo, Jobim, Tomlinson, Ishiguro, Ladeira and his songwriting partner, Cliff Goldmacher from Nashville. Tomlinson and Goldmacher wrote the title song.  

In 2020, Kent released a series of singles and EPs, including "Christmas in the Rockies", "Three Little Birds", "Lovely Day", "Landslide", "I Wish I Could Go Travelling Again", "Bonita" and "Craigie Burn" as a duet with her longtime pianist Art Hirahara. Several of these singles become part of an album released in October 2021, called "Songs From Other Places" for which Kent won 'Best Vocal Performance' at the Jazz Music Awards in Atlanta, Georgia in October 2022. 

Kent has sold more than 2 million albums worldwide and over 400 million streams.

Awards and honors 
 British Jazz Award, 2001
 BBC Jazz Award, Best Vocalist, 2002
 Backstage Bistro Award, 2004
 BBC Jazz Award, Album of the Year, The Lyric, 2006
 Grammy Award nomination, Best Vocal Jazz Album, Breakfast on the Morning Tram, 2009
 Chevalier dans l'Ordre des Arts et des Lettres, 2009
 Jazz Japan Award for 'Best Vocal Album', I Know I Dream, 2018
 Winner of 'Best Vocal Performance' at the Jazz Music Awards for Songs From Other Places, 2022

Discography
 Stacey Kent Sings (July 1995, possible demo recording)
 Close Your Eyes (Candid, 1997)
 Love Is The Tender Trap (Candid, 1998)
 Let Yourself Go: Celebrating Fred Astaire (Candid, 1999)
 Dreamsville (Candid, 2000)
 In Love Again: The Music of Richard Rodgers (Candid, 2002)
 The Boy Next Door (Candid, 2003)
 The Lyric, Stacey Kent with Jim Tomlinson (Token, 2006)
 Breakfast on the Morning Tram (EMI/Blue Note, 2007)
 Raconte-moi... (EMI/Blue Note, 2010)
 Dreamer In Concert (EMI/Blue Note, 2011)
 The Changing Lights (EMI/Blue Note/Warner, 2013)
 Tenderly (Sony/Okeh, 2015)
 I Know I Dream: The Orchestral Sessions (Sony/Okeh, 2017)
 Christmas in the Rockies"EP, Exceleration/Token 2020)
 Three Little Birds (Single, Exceleration/Token 2020)
 Lovely Day (Single, Exceleration/Token 2021)
 I Wish I Could Go Travelling Again (Single, from "Songs From Other Places" series. Exceleration/Token 2021)
 Landslide (Single, from "Songs From Other Places" series. Exceleration/Token 2021)
 Bonita (Single, from "Songs From Other Places" series. Exceleration/Token 2021)
 Craigie Burn (Single, from "Songs From Other Places" series. Exceleration/Token 2021)
 American Tune (Single, from "Songs From Other Places" series. Exceleration/Token 2021)
 Songs From Other Places (Exceleration/Token 2021)

As featured vocalist 
 Eau Calme with enzo enzo (2020) - 1 song
 Frenchy with Thomas Dutronc (Sony, 2019) - 1 song
 Danilo Caymmi Canta Jobim with Danilo Caymmi (Sony, 2013) - 1 song
 Ao Vivo DVD with Marcos Valle (Sony, 2015) - full DVD
 Ao Vivo with Marcos Valle (Sony, 2013) - full album
 Brazil with Quatuor Ébène, Bernard Lavilliers (Erato/Warner, 2014) - 6 songs
 Fiction with Quatuor Ébène, (Erato/Warner, 2012) - 1 song

References

External links 

Interview Zicline.com Étienne Payen

1965 births
Living people
Alumni of the Guildhall School of Music and Drama
American expatriates in the United Kingdom
American women jazz singers
American jazz singers
American people of Russian descent
American radio personalities
BBC Radio 3 presenters
Blue Note Records artists
Candid Records artists
Chevaliers of the Ordre des Arts et des Lettres
Singers from New York (state)
People from South Orange, New Jersey
Newark Academy alumni
Sarah Lawrence College alumni
American women radio presenters
21st-century American women
Okeh Records artists